An efficiency dividend is an annual reduction in resources available to an organization.  It is usually applied as a percentage of operational (running) costs.

It has been used by the Australian Government on Australian Public Service departments and agencies since 1987. 
Some departments and agencies have been exempted.

History 
A 1.25% efficiency dividend was introduced by the Bob Hawke Government in 1987-88.  It was reduced to 1% from 1994-95 to 2004-2005 then increased to 1.25% from 2005-06.  For 2008-09 a one-off 2% efficiency dividend on top of the ongoing efficiency dividend was applied.   In 2011-12 it was 1.5% and in 2012-13 another extra one-off 2.5% was applied.

Controversy 
Proponents of the efficiency dividend argue that it improves the cost effectiveness of the public sector, allows managerial flexibility in the allocation of resources, and is a good way to generate savings in the cost of public sector administration.
Critics have described the efficiency dividend as a blunt instrument, a false economy, and lazy budgeting.   Smaller agencies have also highlighted the difficulty in finding such savings.

References

Government of Australia
Government finances in Australia
History of finance
Economic history of Australia
Political history of Australia